The 2 arrondissements of the Corse-du-Sud department are:
 Arrondissement of Ajaccio, (prefecture of the Corse-du-Sud department: Ajaccio) with 81 communes.  The population of the arrondissement was 113,473 in 2016.  
 Arrondissement of Sartène, (subprefecture: Sartène) with 43 communes. The population of the arrondissement was 40,830 in 2016.

History

In 1800 the arrondissements of Ajaccio and Sartène were established as part of the department Liamone. Between 1811 and 1976 these arrondissements were part of the department Corse, since 1976 they have been arrondissements of the department Corse-du-Sud. In March 2017 the commune Olivese was assigned from the arrondissement of Sartène to the arrondissement of Ajaccio.

References

Corse-du-Sud